Milk Shakes is a mountain in Columbia County, Washington, in the United States.

Milk Shakes, and its earlier name of Twin Tits, was so named because settlers saw it as a breast-shaped hill.

References

Mountains of Columbia County, Washington
Mountains of Washington (state)